The 2016 season is Suphanburi's 6th season in the Thai Premier League of Suphanburi Football Club. Since 2006–2007 and 2013 to present.

Foreign Players

Pre-season and friendlies

Thai League

Thai FA Cup
Chang FA Cup

Thai League Cup
Toyota League Cup

Squad goals statistics

Transfers
First Thai footballer's market is opening on December 14, 2015, to January 28, 2016
Second Thai footballer's market is opening on June 3, 2016, to June 30, 2016

In

Out

Loan in

Loan out

Notes

Suphanburi F.C. seasons
Suphanburi